Øivind Løsåmoen (born 13 October 1957) is a former Norwegian ice hockey player. He was born in Oslo and played for the clubs Furuset IF and Storhamar IL. He played for the Norwegian national ice hockey team at the 1980 and 1984 Winter Olympics.

References

1957 births
Living people
Ice hockey people from Oslo
Norwegian ice hockey players
Olympic ice hockey players of Norway
Ice hockey players at the 1980 Winter Olympics
Ice hockey players at the 1984 Winter Olympics